The Muscovy or Barbary (Cairina moschata domestica) is the domesticated form of the wild Muscovy duck. There are a number of local or regional breeds, and drakes of these are commonly cross-bred with domestic ducks to produce the hybrids called mulards.

Domestication

Muscovy ducks had been domesticated by various Native American cultures in the Americas when Columbus arrived in the Bahamas. The first few were brought onto the Columbus ship Santa Maria they then sailed back to Europe by the 16th century.

The Muscovy duck has been domesticated for centuries, and is widely traded as "Barbary duck". Muscovy breeds are popular because they have stronger-tasting meat — sometimes compared to roasted beef — than that of the domestic duck. The meat is lean when compared to the fatty meat of mallard-derived ducks, its leanness and tenderness being often compared to veal. Muscovy ducks are also less noisy, and sometimes marketed as a "quackless" duck; even though they are not completely silent, they do not actually quack (except in cases of extreme stress). The carcass of a Muscovy duck is also much heavier than most other domestic ducks, which makes it ideal for the dinner table.

Description

Domestic Muscovy ducks are typically somewhat larger than wild-type Muscovy ducks.

Domesticated Muscovy ducks often have plumage different from wild birds. White and light-colored breeds are preferred for meat production, as darker ones can have much melanin in the skin, which some people find unappealing.

Domestic varieties

The original species is approximately black, with small white marks on the wings. Domestic birds come in a variety of colors and patterns.
 Black
 Blue
 Chocolate 
 Piebald (white with any color mixed)
 White
 Lavender
 Bronze
 Ripple
 many Pastel colors, but these are very rare

Hybrids

The Muscovy duck can be crossed with domestic ducks in captivity to produce hybrids, known as mulards ("mule duck") because they are sterile. Muscovy drakes are commercially crossed with domestic duck birds, either naturally or by artificial insemination. The 40–60% of eggs that are fertile result in birds raised only for their meat or for production of foie gras: they grow fast like domestic ducks, but to a large size like Muscovy ducks. The inverse cross, domestic drake with Muscovy duck, is possible, but infrequent.

In addition, Muscovy ducks are reportedly cross-bred in Israel with mallards to produce kosher duck products. The kashrut status of the Muscovy duck has been a matter of rabbinic discussion for over 150 years.

Uses
Oscillococcinum is a homeopathic preparation made from Muscovy duck liver and heart manufactured by the French company Boiron; similar products are also available from other manufacturers. Typically diluted with lactose and sucrose to 1:10400 (far less than one in one googol), they are advertised to relieve influenza-like symptoms, but no evidence has been found of its efficacy.

References

Cairina
Duck breeds
Ducks
Domesticated birds